T.E.V.I.N. is the debut studio album by American R&B singer Tevin Campbell. It was released by Qwest Records on November 19, 1991. The album was certified platinum by Recording Industry Association of America (RIAA) in 1994.

Critical reception

AllMusic editor Stephen Thomas Erlewine rated the album four and a half start out of five. He wrote that Campbell's "voice is remarkably expressive, able to handle both ballads and up-tempo dance tracks without losing confidence. When he has the right material – like the hit single, Prince's "Round and Round" – the results are flawless; if the material is weak, he's merely enjoyable." The album also garnered Campbell his first two Grammy nominations, one in 1991 for Best Male R&B Vocal Performance (for "Round and Round"), and one in 1992 for the same award (for "Tell Me What You Want Me to Do").

Chart performance

T.E.V.I.N.  yielded two No. 1 R&B hits in "Tell Me What You Want Me to Do" and "Alone with You", and had several other hits. Of the combined eight singles that were released off his debut album, five having peaked inside the R&B top 10, Prince produced "Round and Round", while Al B. Sure! and Kyle West produced "Goodbye" and "Just Ask Me To". The remaining singles off his album are "Strawberry Letter 23", "One Song" and "Confused".

Track listing

Personnel 
Adapted from AllMusic.

Dave Aaron – assistant, mixing assistant
Al B. Sure! – arranger, producer, background vocals
Maxi Anderson – background vocals
Airiq Anest – assistant, mixing
Arthur Baker – producer
Tina Baker – background vocals
Rose Banks – background vocals
Kevin Becka – technical assistance
Louis Biancaniello – associate producer, keyboards, programming, drums, Fairlight bass, Moog bass, synthesizer arrangements
Vernon "Ice" Black – guitar
Tevin Campbell – narrator, main vocals
Terry Christian – engineer
Keith "KC" Cohen – mixing
Tyler Collins– background vocals
Eric Daniels – piano
JoJo Hailey – background vocals, vocal arrangements
K-Ci Hailey – background vocals, vocal arrangements
Dave Darlington – engineer
Lynn Davis – background vocals
Nathan East – bass
David Frazer – engineer, mixing
Tom Garneau – engineer
Mick Guzauski – mixing
Jerry Hey – horn arrangements, string arrangements, trumpet
Dan Higgins – Saxophone
Janet Hinde – assistant producer,
Phillip Ingram – background vocals
Kimm James – assistant engineer
Skyler Jett – background vocals
Femi Jiya – engineer
Karen Jones – A&R
Quincy Jones – executive producer
Michael Koppelman – engineer
Axel Kroell – programming
Ricky Lawson – drums
Janice Lee – production coordination
Robin Lynch – art direction
Mike Mani – associate producer, keyboards, programming, drum programming, Fairlight CMI, synthesizer arrangements
Richard McKernan – engineer, string engineer
Kelly McRae – production coordination
Benny Medina – A&R, executive producer
B.J. Nelson – background vocals
Michael Omartian – arranger, drums, producer, programming, synthesizer
David Pack – background vocals
Victoria Pearson – photography
Elliott Peters – engineer
Greg Phillinganes – keyboards
Mark Plati – engineer, programming
Prince – arranger, multi instruments, producer, voices
QDIII – producer, scratching, synthesizer
William Frank "Bill" Reichenbach Jr. – Trombone
Marc Reyburn – Engineer
Claytoven Richardson – production consultant, background vocals
Marnie Riley – assistant engineer
Angel Rogers – background vocals
Susan Rogers – engineer
Greg Ross – design
Lovis Scalise – engineer
Cynthia Shiloh – production coordination
Susan – engineer
JoAnn Tominaga – coordination
Rob Trow – background vocals
Junior Vasquez – mixing, post production
Kevin Walden – production coordination
Narada Michael Walden – drums, keyboards, producer, programming
Justin Warfield – rapping
Kyle West – producer
Larry Williams – saxophone
Ric Wilson – acoustic guitar
Monalisa Young – background vocals
Todd Yvega – synthesizer, synthesizer programming

Charts

Weekly charts

Year-end charts

Certifications

References

External links
 Tevin Campbell-T.E.V.I.N. at Discogs

1991 debut albums
Tevin Campbell albums
Qwest Records albums
Warner Records albums
Albums produced by Quincy Jones
Albums produced by Al B. Sure!
Albums produced by Prince (musician)
Albums produced by Narada Michael Walden